Walter Benjamin Rogers (10 May 1889 – 18 July 1965) was an Australian rules footballer who played with Richmond in the Victorian Football League (VFL).

Notes

External links 

1889 births
1965 deaths
Australian rules footballers from Victoria (Australia)
Richmond Football Club players